KBRE (1660 AM) is a commercial radio station in Merced, California. It is owned by the Stephens Media Group, through licensee SMG-Merced, LLC.  It plays a mix of active rock and alternative rock, calling itself "105.7 The Bear."  Programming is also heard on 250 watt FM translator 105.7 K289CB in nearby Los Banos.

The AM station is powered at 10,000 watts by day, 1,000 watts at night, using a non-directional antenna. The AM transmitter is off South Bert Crane Road in Atwater.

History

KBRE began as the "expanded band" twin to a station on the standard AM band. On March 17, 1997 the Federal Communications Commission (FCC) announced that eighty-eight stations had been given permission to move to newly available "Expanded Band" transmitting frequencies, ranging from 1610 to 1700 kHz, with then-KLOQ in Merced authorized to move from 1580 kHz to 1660 kHz.

The FCC's initial policy was that both the original station and its expanded band counterpart could operate simultaneously for up to five years, after which owners would have to turn in one of the two licenses, depending on whether they preferred the new assignment or elected to remain on the original frequency. It was decided to shut down the standard band station, and on August 13, 2004 the license for original station, now KVVY, on 1580 kHz was cancelled.

Sports radio
A construction permit for the expanded band station was assigned the call letters KAXW on January 9, 1998. The station signed on the air on November 1, 1999.  It was owned by Clarke Broadcasting and aired a sports radio format.

On February 12, 2002 the station changed its call sign to KTIQ.  It continued to carry a sports format, known as "The Ticket" (indicated by the letters "TIQ").  In late 2007/early 2008, the station switched to Spanish-language Christian radio as "Amistad Christiana".

Switch to rock
On March 16, 2016, 92.5 KBRE's old active/alternative rock format moved to AM 1660, calling itself "105.7 The Bear."  It added FM translator K289CB Los Banos. The station changed its call sign to KBRE on May 11, 2016.

Acquisition by Stephens Media
On July 1, 2019, Mapleton Communications announced its intent to sell its remaining 37 stations to Stephens Media Group. Stephens began operating the station that same day. The sale was consummated on September 30, 2019 at a price of $21 million.

Former logo

References

External links

BRE
Radio stations established in 2001
2001 establishments in California
Active rock radio stations in the United States
KBRE